Erik Ahlstrand (born 14 October 2001) is a Swedish football midfielder who plays for Halmstads BK.

References

2001 births
Living people
Swedish footballers
Association football midfielders
Halmstads BK players
Superettan players
Allsvenskan players